Darmur (also Romanized as Darmūr) is a village in Howli Rural District, in the Central District of Paveh County, Kermanshah Province, Iran. At the 2006 census, its population was 24, in 6 families.

References 

Populated places in Paveh County